A Triumph for Man is the first album by Danish band Mew, released in April 1997 by the Danish record label Exlibris Musik.

Only 2,000 copies of the album were printed initially and prices for an original copy have reached upwards of US$200 on auction site eBay.

On 18 September 2006 A Triumph for Man was re-released along with a CD with bonus material, including demos and acoustic versions of songs.

Track listing
 "Wheels over Me" – 2:33
 "Beautiful Balloon" – 4:27
 "Wherever" – 5:56
 "Panda" – 4:11
 "Then I Run" – 3:53
 "Life Is Not Distant" – 1:08
 "No Shadow Kick" – 3:06
 "Snowflake" – 3:30
 "She Came Home for Christmas" – 4:54
 "Pink Monster" – 0:46
 "I Should Have Been a Tsin-Tsi (for You)" – 2:19
 "How Things Turn out to Be" – 0:44
 "Web" – 4:34
 "Coffee Break" – 4:37

2006 reissue bonus disc
 "Studio Snippet #1" – 0:31
 "Say You're Sorry" (ATFM Session) – 6:09
 "Beautiful Balloon" (acoustic) – 4:15
 "Web" (demo) – 5:42
 "Chinese Gun" (demo) – 3:06
 "Studio Snippet #2" – 0:30
 "I Should Have Been a Tsin-Tsi (For You)" (demo) – 1:43
 "Wheels over Me" (demo) – 2:48
 "Superfriends" (demo) – 4:40

Personnel 
 Jonas Bjerre - lead vocals, guitars, synthesizers, accordion, piano, glass
 Bo Madsen - guitars, synthesizers, piano, bell
 Johan Wohlert - bass, backing vocals, guitars, synthesizers, piano
 Silas Graae - drums, percussion

Singles
Mew only released one proper single from their first album, "She Came Home for Christmas". However a promo-single "I Should Have Been a Tsin-Tsi (For You)" was released in March 1997, before the album.

References

Mew (band) albums
1997 debut albums